Trevor Gowers (26 April 1945 – 9 June 1996) was  a former Australian rules footballer who played with Richmond in the Victorian Football League (VFL).

Notes

External links 		
		
		
		
		
		
		
		
1945 births		
1996 deaths		
Australian rules footballers from Victoria (Australia)		
Richmond Football Club players